Brigadier General Sidney Goodall Francis DSO & Bar (1874–1955) was a senior British Army officer during the First World War.

Biography

Born on 24 December 1874, Sidney Goodall Francis was educated at Bedford School. He received his first commission as a second lieutenant in the West Yorkshire Regiment in 1895, served during the Second Boer War, between 1899 and 1902, and received the Distinguished Service Order in 1900. He was promoted to the rank of captain in 1904, serving on the North West Frontier and during the Mohmand Expedition of 1908. He served during the First World War, was promoted to the rank of major in 1915, to the rank of lieutenant colonel in 1916, and to the rank of brigadier general in 1917. He received a second Distinguished Service Order in 1918. He was appointed commanding officer of the 1st Battalion, Royal Berkshire Regiment, in 1920.

Brigadier General Sidney Goodall Francis retired from the British Army in 1925 and died in Sway, Hampshire, on 29 March 1955, aged 80.

References

1874 births
1955 deaths
People educated at Bedford School
British Army personnel of World War I
British Army personnel of the Second Boer War
Companions of the Distinguished Service Order
British Army brigadiers